Selection: 25h Anniversary Self Selection is a compilation album by Japanese idol duo Wink, released by Polystar on June 5, 2013. The two-disc album compiles the duo's singles, B-sides, and deep cuts selected by members Sachiko Suzuki and Shoko Aida.

The album peaked at No. 231 on Oricon's albums chart.

Track listing

Charts

Footnotes

References

External links 
 
 

2013 compilation albums
Wink (duo) compilation albums
Japanese-language compilation albums